Leucanopsis athor is a moth of the family Erebidae. It was described by William Schaus in 1933. It is found in Brazil.

References

athor
Moths described in 1933